Roots of Resistance was an anti-racist organization active in Vancouver, British Columbia, Canada from 1992 to 1996. The organization was formed shortly after a Vancouver demonstration in support of Rodney King during the 1992 Los Angeles riots, fusing an affinity group called Anarchists of Colour with Langara College's students of colour collective, the Third World Alliance, and other activists. Roots of Resistance was composed of people of colour only, with members of African, Asian, First Nations and Latin American ancestry, including people of mixed-race.

Members of Roots of Resistance were of various left-wing political tendencies, from anarchism to Marxism, as well as divergent cultural and religious perspectives. Uniting the group was an anti-colonial and anti-capitalist critique, including support of First Nations sovereignty and opposition to global imperialism. Roots of Resistance also criticized parliamentary attempts to restrict immigration, and directly opposed neo-fascist activity, two important issues in early- to mid-1990s Canada.

Roots of Resistance's people of colour-only membership was an organizational strategy developed to address racism from a position of strength and affinity, but also to reject what was seen as a white cultural hegemony within the radical left which effectively excluded people of colour and their perspectives. (This critique was aimed at, to name a few examples, the white-led left's reduction of all matters of power to "the class struggle"; its "generation gap"-inflected suspicion of elders; its insensitivity to the importance of spirituality for some communities; its emphasis on counterculture over community; etc.)

These various prejudices of the white-dominated left were essentially challenged by the founding of an allied group with an all brown membership. Roots of Resistance frequently worked in coalition with white allies, and was not a separatist organization, nor was it anti-white. Roots of Resistance's most newsworthy moments were its Anti-Canada Day demonstrations on 1 July, events designed to expose the colonialist and genocidal history of the Canadian state.

See also
 Anti-racism

Anti-racist organizations in Canada
Anti-capitalist organizations